Ladislav John "Walter" Ostanek, CM (born 20 April 1935) is a Canadian musician. He is known as "Canada's Polka King." He has received twenty-one nominations for Grammy Awards and won three.

Early life
Born in Duparquet, Quebec in 1935, his family moved to St. Catharines, Ontario, when he was a boy. A young Ostanek received his first accordion as a gift in 1944. After several years, Ostanek became a popular entertainer in Southern Ontario, performing Slovenian-style (also known as Cleveland-style) polkas and waltzes. He could be heard frequently on the radio in St. Catharines and Welland. Walter began playing polka after his best friend introduced him to the accordion at age 5.

Career
In 1957 Ostanek formed his own band playing Slovenian-style polka music. In 1963, Ostanek and his band, the Walter Ostanek Band, would record their first of many albums. Over his career, Ostanek would record more than 50 albums and become known as Canada's Polka King. He has received three Grammy Awards and he has been nominated thirteen times. His style has been compared to America's Polka King, Frankie Yankovic of Cleveland. Like the late Yankovic, Walter Ostanek is of Slovene descent.

Ostanek hosted his own television shows (one for fourteen consecutive years), radio shows, and polka tours. He has appeared on The Tonight Show Starring Johnny Carson, Phil Donahue, Tommy Hunter Show, Cleveland's Polka Varieties, and his own award-winning TV specials and telethons. He has appeared in concert with Roy Clark, The Oak Ridge Boys, Ronnie Milsap, Ray Price, Mel Tillis, Brenda Lee, Slim Whitman, Tom T. Hall, T. G. Sheppard, Tommy Hunter, Lawrence Welk, Myron Floren, Frank Yankovic, Black Forest Band, and Weiss Blau.

Ostanek is a member of Canada's Walk of Fame as well as the Polka Halls of Fame in Cleveland and Chicago. Currently Ostanek does two main concert sets each year: one at Marineland in Niagara Falls, Ontario, the other during Oktoberfest in Kitchener, Ontario.

He is also the subject of the 2006 Bravo! network documentary The Cult of Walt: Canada's Polka King. Ostanek is also cited as the inspiration for the Second City Television polka parody, the Shmenge Brothers, and the Osler show.

In 2007, Ostanek was the recipient of the Lifetime Achievement Award at the annual SOCAN Awards in Toronto.

Ostanek currently resides in St. Catharines, Ontario. He was the owner of the popular music store "Ostanek's" until 1 April 2013, when the store was converted to a Long & McQuade. He still plays locally.

Lottery
In July 2016 Ostanek was in the news when he won a million dollars in the London Dream Lottery, which raises money for hospitals.

Awards and recognition
 1992, 1993, 1994: winner, Grammy Award for Best Polka Album
 1999: appointed Member of the Order of Canada
 2001: inductee, Canada's Walk of Fame
 2007: SOCAN Lifetime Achievement Award

Discography

Singles
ca 1962 "Walter Ostan" Marianne
1998 "Larhonda Polka" Here Come the Polka Heroes

Walter Ostanek Band
 The Walter Ostanek Band

Walter Ostanek and His Band
 35th Anniversary
 Accordionally Yours

Walter Ostanek and His Polka Band
 I Like Frankie Yankovic

Walter Ostanek and His Polka Kings
 Polka Party

Walter Ostanek
 Music and Friends
 Marineland Favourites 
  Like Father, Like Son
1995 Polka Monster (EP)

Walter Ostanek and his Orchestra
 Centennial Dance Party

References

External links
 

1935 births
Living people
Anglophone Quebec people
People from Abitibi-Témiscamingue
Canadian people of Slovenian descent
Musicians from Quebec
Musicians from St. Catharines
Canadian accordionists
Members of the Order of Canada
Grammy Award winners
Polka musicians
21st-century accordionists